Lacy Michele Dagen (born May 17, 1997 in Concord, California) is an American collegiate artistic gymnast. She competed for the Florida Gators gymnastics team from 2015 to 2017. She currently competes for the Oregon State Beavers gymnastics team.

Early life 
On May 17, 1997, Dagen was born as Lacy Michele Dagen in Concord, California. Dagen's father is Shawn Dagen, the president of FreshSource North and her mother is Paige Dagen, an English teacher at Foothill High School. She has one younger sister, Madison (b. December 27, 1999), who is also a gymnast; committed to the Oregon State Beavers.

In 2001, Dagen began gymnastics classes at Cal West Gymnastics, after continuously doing cartwheels. The club changed owners and became Bay Aerials Gymnastics, where Dagen trained and competed until 2006 when she moved to Pacific West Gymnastics. In 2008, she became the Level 8 Regional champion. A year later, in 2009, Dagen placed tenth in the all-around at the 2009 Westerns. Lacy remained a level nine gymnast for the 2010 season; winning the Western Championship.

Gymnastics career

2011—12: Level 10 career 
In 2011, Lacy moved up to Level 10 for the 2011 season. She participated in a few invitationals but had to retire for the season, due to injury. Following the 2011 season, she moved to San Mateo Gymnastics. A year later, in 2012, Dagen competed as a level ten again. She was third at States and seventeenth at Regionals.

2012—13: Elite career 
In February 2012, Dagen participated at the WOGA Elite Qualifier; qualifying elite status. In May, Lacy was tenth in the all-around at the American Classic at the Karolyi Ranch. At the 2012 U.S. Classic, Dagen was fourteenth in the all-around. Later, in St Louis, Missouri, she competed at U.S. Nationals where she placed sixteenth in the all-around.

On January 7, 2013, it was announced that she had committed to the Florida Gators gymnastics program. In 2013, Dagen advanced to Senior International Elite status, due to her turning sixteen. In July, she was fifth at the American Classic. She was scheduled to participate in the 2013 Secret U.S. Classic but didn't attend due to injury.

2014—15: Level 10 career 
After deciding to transition from Elite to Level 10, Dagen was State and Regional Champion. At J.O. Nationals, she was third in the all-around and was the beam champion. On November 13, 2014, she signed the National Letter of Intent to the Florida Gators. Dagen competed at three invitationals throughout the 2015 season but was nursing a minor injury throughout the Championship season.

References

1997 births
People from Pleasanton, California
American female artistic gymnasts
Florida Gators women's gymnasts
University of Florida alumni
Living people
Oregon State Beavers women's gymnasts
21st-century American women